Iron Ivan is a 2014 Russian biographical sports drama film directed by Gleb Orlov. The plot of the film in many ways repeats the Soviet film The Wrestler and the Clown.

Plot 
The film tells about the fighter Ivan Poddubny, who could defeat any opponent in the ring, but lost to love.

Cast 
 Mikhail Porechenkov as Ivan Poddubny
 Katerina Shpitsa as Maria "Masha" Dozmarova, a gymnast, Ivan Poddubny's beloved
 Aleksandr Mikhailov as Maxim Ivanovich Poddubny, Ivan Poddubny's Father
 Roman Madyanov as Tverdokhlebov, Circus Director
 Vladimir Ilyin as Drubich, Poddubny's Manager
 Yuri Kolokolnikov as Count Korsakov, Poddubny's Manager
 Denis Lavant as Eugene de Paris, Poddubny's Coach
 Mikhail Krylov as Terry Covel, Poddubny's Manager in the USA
 Pyotr Krylov as Nikita Poddubny, Ivan Poddubny's brother
 Andrey Smolka as Mitrofan Poddubny, Ivan Poddubny's brother 
 Harry Anichkin as Chief Judge
 Nina Antonova as Nurse
 Velizar Binev as American Neighbour
 Terry Bird as Scott

Production

Filming
Funds for location shooting of the film were provided in the summer of 2012 by the Cinema Foundation and took place in Sevastopol, Moscow, Paris and New York.

References

External links 
 

2014 films
2010s Russian-language films
2010s biographical drama films
2010s sports drama films
Russian biographical drama films
Russian sports drama films
Sports films based on actual events
Sport wrestling films
Films based on biographies
Biographical films about sportspeople
Cultural depictions of Russian men
Mixed martial arts films